St. Johns Unified School District (SJUSD) is a school district headquartered in St. Johns, Arizona.

The district's schools include Coronado Elementary School, St. Johns Middle School, and St. Johns High School.

In 2019 most grade levels in the district had AzMERIT scores above grade level.

From 2020 to 2021 the number of students in the district declined by 5%.

References

External links

 

School districts in Apache County, Arizona